Herbin can refer to:

Last name
 Auguste Herbin (1882–1960), French modern artist
 Raphaèle Herbin, French mathematician
 Robert Herbin (1939–2020), French footballer
 René Herbin (1911–1953), French classical pianist

First name
 Herbin Hoyos, exiled Colombian journalist